Yaşar University (Turkish: Yaşar Üniversitesi) is a university in İzmir, Turkey on the Aegean Sea. The university faculty teaches in English, with programs at both the undergraduate and postgraduate level.

History 
Selcuk Yaşar Sports and Education Foundation decided to establish Yaşar University in 1999, as a modern university in the city of Izmir. The Turkish National Assembly approved the creation of the university on 29 March 2001. Education started within its Alsancak premises in the academic year of 2002-2003. The Selçuk Yaşar Bornova Campus was opened in 2008.

Philosophy 
Yaşar University presents itself as a "boutique university". Its goal is to be identified as a small but prestigious international Turkish university.

Organization 
Yaşar University is divided into seven undergraduate faculties which have 25 different academic programs. Undergraduate divisions include:

 Faculty of Communication: Public Relations and Advertising; Radio, Cinema and Television; Visual Communication Design
 Faculty of Economics and Administrative Sciences: Business Administration; Economics; International Logistics Management; International Trade and Finance; Travel Management and Tourism Guidance; International Relations. The language of instruction for all departments is English
 Faculty of Architecture: Architecture; Interior Architecture and Environmental Design
 Faculty of Science and Letters: English Language and Literature; Mathematics; Statistics; Psychology; Translation and Interpreting
 Faculty of Engineering: Computer Engineering; Electrical and Electronics Engineering; Energy Systems Engineering; Industrial Engineering; Software Engineering
 Faculty of Art and Design: Film Design; Graphic Design; Industrial Design; Music
 Faculty of Law: LLB in Law

The graduate program consists of two graduate schools; the Graduate School of Social Sciences and Graduate School of Natural and Applied Sciences. The graduate schools have 22 different Master's and PHD programs.

The vocational school offers nine associate degree programs.

The Yaşar University School of Foreign Languages provides an English preparatory year for students needing to reach the language level for faculty. Other languages taught at the School of Foreign Languages include: Russian, Spanish, Italian, German, Japanese, French, and Portuguese. Yaşar University is the first in Turkey to have its language school accredited by the Commission on English Language Program Accreditation (CEA).

Campus

Selçuk Yaşar Campus 
Located in the Izmir district of Bornova, the Selçuk Yaşar Campus serves as the main campus for Yaşar University.

Sports Center 
The Yaşar University Sports Center facilities provides a variety of physical activities to keep students healthy. The Sports Center includes; a gymnasium, tennis courts, dance studio, volleyball and basketball courts. The Sports Center organizes  fitness training, club sports, intramural and ladder tournaments, instructional programmes and seminars.

Electronic Information and Documentation Center 
Yaşar University's Electronic Information and Documentation Center adds to the University's education and research mission at the national and international level.  Students and faculty are able to access a wide variety of sources, including audio-visual materials, journals and newspapers. The Electronic Information and Documentation center is classified according to the Library of Congress Classification System.  Electronic resources include: over 50,000 e-books and 25 databases that reach 19,000 e-journals.

Media Center 
Yasar University hosts a hi-tech media center. It is the first Turkish university where TV and radio studios broadcast in high definition. The Media Center produces regular television and radio programmes in multiple languages and gives Yaşar University students the opportunity for hands-on experience with high quality equipment.

Alsancak Campus 
The Yaşar University Alsancak Campus was home to the School of Foreign Languages until 2014. In 2014, all departments are united in Selçuk Yaşar Campus.

References 

Educational institutions established in 2001
Private universities and colleges in Turkey
Universities and colleges in İzmir
2001 establishments in Turkey